Froissy is a village and hameau, part of the municipality (commune) of La Neuville-lès-Bray, in the department of Somme, Hauts-de-France, northern France.

Geography
The village is located in a meander of the river Somme, few km in south of La Neuville-lès-Bray and Bray-sur-Somme. It is crossed in the middle by the Canal de la Somme and, in south-east of it, is located a railway station of a touristic railway.

Village's main roads are the Route de Roye, part of the D329 departmental road, and Rue du Port, running through the northern shore of the canal.

Main sights

Froissy is the western terminus of the Froissy Dompierre Light Railway (also named P'tit Train de la Haute Somme), a heritage and touristic narrow gauge railway. In Froissy station is located a museum, the Musée des chemins de fer Militaires et Industriels (Military and Industrial railways Museum).

References

External links

Villages in Hauts-de-France